The Jordan River is a  stream in the northwestern part of the lower peninsula in the U.S. state of Michigan. It is the largest tributary of Lake Charlevoix.  The Jordan's headwaters rise from springs in the upper Jordan River Valley northeast of Mancelona in Antrim County.  The Jordan River was the first river to be designated in Michigan's Natural Rivers Program.

The Jordan River is well known for its world-class brook trout fishing and for its scenic canoe trips.  The headwaters are accessible by many foot and ATV trails.

Course 
The Jordan River begins in central Warner Township in northeast Antrim County. It winds generally to the southwest, cutting across the northwest corner of Star Township before flowing west through northern Chestonia Township. It then turns to the north, flowing through Jordan Township, the northeast corner of Echo Township, then into South Arm Township in Charlevoix County and emptying into the south arm of Lake Charlevoix in East Jordan.

Tributaries 
 (right) Jones Creek
 (left) Deer Creek
 Patricia Lake
 (left) Healeys Trout Pond
 (right) Marvon Creek
 (right) Eaton Creek
 (right) Warner Creek
 (left) Hog Creek
 O'Brien Pond
 (right) Collins Creek
 Deer Lake
 (right) Bennett Creek
 Mud Lake
 (left) Todd Creek
 (right) Bartholemew Creek
 (left) Severance Creek
 (left) Webster Creek
 (left) Gook Creek
 (right) Lilak Creek
 (right) Martin Creek
 (left) Mill Creek
 (left) Sutton Creek
 (right) Cokirs Creek, also known as Kocher Creek
 (left) Scott Creek
 (left) Tutstone Creek
 (right) Green River
 (right) Stevens Creek
 (right) Landslide Creek
 (right) Cascade Creek
 (right) Section Thirteen Creek
 (right) Six Tile Creek

Drainage basin 
The Jordan River system drains all or portions of the following cities, villages and townships:
 Antrim County
 Echo Township
 Chestonia Township
 Jordan Township
 Star Township
 Warner Township
 Charlevoix County
 Boyne Valley Township
 East Jordan
 South Arm Township
 Wilson Township

References 

Rivers of Michigan
Rivers of Charlevoix County, Michigan
Rivers of Antrim County, Michigan
Tributaries of Lake Michigan